Hoops McCann may refer to:
A character in the 1980 song “Glamour Profession” by Steely Dan
A character in the 1986 film One Crazy Summer, portrayed by John Cusack